The Good Hope (from Dutch: Op Hoop van Zegen; more literally: Hoping for the best) is a Dutch play written by Herman Heijermans in 1900/1901.

It takes place in a fishing village, with the conflict between the fishermen and their employer ending in tragedy with the unsound boat setting out to sea and sinking with all hands and the owner pocketing the insurance money. It is still staged, and remains the most popular play by Dutch dramatist Herman Heijermans. The socialist Heijermans is considered to have meant the play as a criticism of the entire capitalist system, though some present-day productions downplay this radical approach.

It was translated in a new version for the Royal National Theatre, which relocated the action to the Yorkshire fishing community of Whitby in 1900, by Lee Hall, writer of the award-winning Billy Elliot and Spoonface Steinberg.

The voyage of The Good Hope is a journey on which the life of the entire community depends. A storm rages, the women and children wait ashore, the boat follows the Greenland catch. A Dutch classic of the social realist theatre.

Its original Dutch title is Op Hoop Van Zegen; it was translated into English and produced as early as 1903 and produced for the first time in England by the Stage Society on 26 April 1903. The very well known actress Miss Ellen Terry had it produced in all the leading towns of the English provinces and in the London suburbs in 1904 and 1905. On her American tour in 1906–07 the play was revived by her as it was later by The Pioneer Players on 3 November 1912.

All this according to a letter of 10 May 1979 by Mrs. Anthony Thomas, curator of the Ellen Terry Memorial Museum, Tenterden, Kent.

There are four films based on the play. The most recent was made in 1986, featuring Danny de Munk as Barend.

See also
 Coffin ships (insurance)

References

External links

"Playwright Heijermans against capitalism" - Review of the play
imdb.com
Text of the play 
neerlandsfilmdoek.nl
Picture of the play 1954

1901 plays
Dutch plays
Socialism
History of fishing
Plays set in the Netherlands
Plays set in the 1900s
Dutch plays adapted into films
1900 plays